Våg og vinn was a Norwegian television program that aired on TV3 and was hosted by Jarl Goli and Lise Nilsen.

About the show
Våg og vinn was a program where regular people would get challenged to take risks. The host would offer money for the person to take the risk.

Challenges
Among the challenges in the program you would see Camilla get attacked by 50 000 bees, Norwegian News Agency journalist Bjørn Hassel would balance an iron steel pipe across Lysefjorden. Mia Gundersen was one of the celebrities who would get challenged.

External links
On-Air AS
 

TV3 (Norway) original programming
Norwegian reality television series
1997 Norwegian television series debuts
1997 Norwegian television series endings
1990s Norwegian television series